William Ernest Goodman (September 29, 1879 – April 26, 1949) was an American cricketer. He was born in Pennsylvania, USA. His brother Samuel was also a notable American cricketer. William Goodman died in Philadelphia in 1949.

Career
Goodman made his debut for the United States national cricket team in August 1899, playing against Canada in Rosedale, Toronto. The following month, he played for Philadelphia against All New York on Staten Island.

In October 1899, he played his only first-class match for Philadelphia against KS Ranjitsinhji's XI. He played one more time for the US national side against Canada the following September, and later played for the Straits Settlements against the Federated Malay States in August 1909.

References

1879 births
1949 deaths
Cricketers from Philadelphia
Straits Settlements cricketers
Philadelphian cricketers
American cricketers